The 1957–58 season was the 12th season in FK Partizan's existence. This article shows player statistics and matches that the club played during the 1957–58 season.

Players
Mačvan, JESAM

Squad information

Friendlies

Competitions

Yugoslav First League

Yugoslav Cup

Danube Cup

Round of 16

See also
 List of FK Partizan seasons

References

External links
 Official website
 Partizanopedia 1957-58  (in Serbian)

FK Partizan seasons
Partizan